Guðmundur Emil Jónsson (27 October 1902 – 30 November 1986) was prime minister of Iceland from 23 December 1958 to 20 November 1959.

He first became minister of Fisheries and Social affairs. He was a chairman of the Social Democratic Party (Alþýðuflokkurinn) from 1956 to 1968. He was a member of the Althingi from 1934 to 1971, and its speaker from 1956 to 1958.

References

1902 births
1986 deaths
Emil Jonsson
Emil Jónsson
Emil Jonsson
Emil Jonsson
Emil Jonsson